Martin Fischer was the defending champion but decided not to participate.

Michał Przysiężny won the title defeating John Millman in the final, 6–3, 3–6, 6–3.

Seeds

Draw

Finals

Top half

Bottom half

References
 Main Draw
 Qualifying Draw

Shimadzu All Japan Indoor Tennis Championships - Singles
2015 Singles